Henk Baars (born 3 August 1960 in Diessen) is a former professional Dutch cyclo-cross cyclist who was among the best Dutch cyclo-cross cyclists in the late 1980s to mid 1990s. 
Baars’ greatest win was when he became World Champion on a Spanish course in Guecho in 1990. His win was unexpected at the time as Adri van der Poel was the big favourite for the race. Other wins in his career included the Dutch national Mountainbike title in 1989 and Dutch national cyclo-cross champion in 1993.  Baars now runs a sports and cycle business in Diessen.

External links

1960 births
Living people
Cyclo-cross cyclists
Dutch male cyclists
People from Hilvarenbeek
UCI Cyclo-cross World Champions (men)
Cyclists from North Brabant